Pink Arrow or Pink Arrows may refer to:

 Pink Arrow, Arizona, a town in Navajo County, Arizona
 Pink Arrow, a super hero character in the adult comic series SuperFuckers
 Pink Arrow Pride, a charitable project to support breast cancer victims in Lowell, Michigan
 Pink Arrows, the nickname of the Lowell High School (Lowell, Michigan) football team during Pink Arrow Pride games (Pink Arrow games)

See also
 Arrow (disambiguation)
 Black Arrow (disambiguation)
 Blue Arrow (disambiguation)
 Golden Arrow (disambiguation)
 Green Arrow (disambiguation)
 Red Arrow (disambiguation)
 Silver Arrow (disambiguation)
 White Arrow (disambiguation)
 Yellow Arrow (disambiguation)